The 2020 Dominic Thiem tennis season saw Dominic Thiem win his first Grand Slam title at the 2020 US Open, defeating Alexander Zverev in a fifth-set tiebreak after being two sets down. In this season he became the first player to win a grand slam from this position since 2004 and the first at the US Open since Pancho Gonzales in 1949.

Yearly summary

Early hard court season

ATP Cup

Thiem started his 2020 season at the new event ATP Cup as a part of the Austrian squad. He was playing alongside his friend Dennis Novak, Sebastian Ofner, Jürgen Melzer, and his doubles specialist Oliver Marach. Thiem chose Thomas
Muster to be capitain of Team Austria.
In his first match, Thiem was beaten by Borna Coric in three tight sets. Team Austria lost their match 0-3 about Team
Croatia. Thiem won his second match over Argentine Diego Schwartzman in straight sets. With the chance to get the quarters, his team must win over Team Poland in the final robin-round-match. After Austria lost the first match with Dennis Novak, Thiem need a win about the polish Hubert Hurkacz. He lost the match in three sets, and his 
team didn't qualify for the Quarters ATP Cup.

Australian Open

Thiem was a part of AO Rally to Relief for extended help the bushfires in Australia. He was a part of team Serena Williams and
won 4-3 with his mates. In the tournament he won the first round over Adrian Mannarino in three sets, the second Round over 
Wildcard player Alex Bolt in five sets. In the Round of 32 he beats Taylor Fritz in 4 sets and in Round four Gael Monfils in three straight sets to reach his 1st Australian Open-Quarterfinal. He met the World-Nr.1 Rafael Nadal and won this match in four tight sets with 7-6, 7-6, 4-6, 7-6. All the sets Thiem on by tiebreakers. In the Semis he met his friend Alexander Zverev. After a worse start, Thiem won this match in four tight sets and reached his 3rd Grand-Slam-Final. In the final he met the seventh-time-Australian Open Champion Novak Djokovic. After Thiem lost the opening set 4-6, he won set two and three
6-4, 4-2. After Djokovic saved a break point early in the fourth, Djokovic won the fourth set 6-3 to get a decider. An early break for Djokovic and almost perfect serving games decide the match and Djokovic defended his title. After the match Djokovic sprinkled roses to Thiem: "Tough luck and it was a tough match, but you were very close to winning it and you definitely have a lot more time in your career and I’m sure that you will get one of the Grand Slam trophies. More than one."

American Swing

Rio de Janeiro

Thiem withdrew from Cordoba and played the Rio Open. After a three set win over Felipe Meligeni Alves and win over the Spaniard Jaume Munar he lost the quarters by the qualifier Gianluca Mager in straight sets. Thiem withdrew from Acapulco and prepared to defend the Masters title in Indian Wells, California.

On 2 March, he was World-Nr. 3.

Season hiatus
On March 8, due to the COVID-19 pandemic, the season went on hiatus for several months. The following measures were taken:

 The ATP and WTA announced the suspension of their 2020 tournaments until August 16. On March 18, the ATP froze their player rankings. 

 On March 17, the French Tennis Federation announced the decision of postponing the French Open, to be held now from September 27 to October 11, 2020.

 On March 24, after talks between Japan's prime minister and the International Olympic Committee president, the 2020 Summer Olympics were officially postponed to 2021. On March 30, the various organising entities reached an agreement to hold the Olympics between July 23 and August 8, 2021.

 On April 1, the All England Club announced the decision of cancelling Wimbledon, opting to focus on the 2021 edition of the tournament.

American outdoor hardcourt season

Cincinnati Masters

After Thiem played 28 exhibition-matches in the Covid-break he lost the second round by Filip Krajinovic in straight sets.

US Open

Thiem entered the US Open as the second seed. He played in the bottom half of the tournament. Thiem got in Round 2 after the retire win over
the spaniard Jaume Munar in two sets. In Round two he beat Sumit Nagal in three sets, in round three he won over the 2014 
US Open Marin Cilic on four sets. Thiem won over Felix Auger-Aliassime in straight sets in the Round of 16 and reached his
second US-Open-quarterfinal after 2018. In the Quarters he beats Alex De Minaur in straight sets. In the Semis he met the
last year finalist Daniil Medvedev. Thiem won the first set 6-2 and comebacks in set two and three after a break down and won
both tiebreakers. Thiem dominated the match but had problems with his right Achilles tendon, during the third set he slipped out on his
shoes and screamed in his home language: "Was sind das für Schuhe? Was sind das für SCHUHE???". The commentators had 
compassison for his shoes mark Adidas. Thiem won the match 6-2, 7-6, 7-6 and reached his fourth Grand-Slam-Final. He 
crushed the final with his great friend Alexander Zverev. After Djokovic's default in Round 4, Thiem was the big favourite to 
win title with Medvedev.

In the final Thiem lost the first two sets 2-6, 4-6. After an early break for Zverev in the third, Thiem was on
the road to lost his fourth Grand-Slam final. After the rebreak Thiem said after the match: "From that moment [rebreak to 2-2]
I felt me so free and played better tennis." Thiem won set three with a late break 6-4 and the fourth 6-3 to get a deciding 
set. After Thiem lost his serve to 3-5, he comebacks to lead 6-5 and could serving out for the title. Thiem made a medical
timeout for his thighs problems and he was broken by Zverev to 6-6. The further tiebreak was the first in Open-Era-history in 
an US Open Final. Thiem leads the tiebreak 6-4 to get two Championship points. Thiem missed both points with forehand errors and
gets his third Championship Points after passed Zverev on the net. With a backhand missed Thiem won the US Open and his
first Grand-Slam-title. Thiem congrats his friend Alexander Zverev for an unbelivebale tournament and thanked the US Open team
and volunterrs for this special situation. He also thanks to his home country Austria, especially his grandparents.

After the match Thiem said, "I was so nervous before and during the match, I thought this could be my last chance to win an 
Grand-Slam-title. After I had a worse start, the rebreak in the third set was the deciding moment for me. After that moment 
I played my tennis better and better and in the end it was only drama."

Dominic Thiem was the first men who was born 1990's to win a Grand-Slam-title in men's tennis. He was the first men in
Open Era history to win the US Open Final after 0-2, the first in US Open history since Pancho Gonzalez 1949. He was also the
fifth men in Open-Era-history (since 1968) to win a Grand-Slam-final aftet 0-2 sets down, the first since Gaston Gaudio at 
Roland Garros 2004.

Roland Garros and late indoor season

French Open

After Thiem won the US Open he withdrew from the Rome Masters. In the tournament he won over Marin Cilic, Jack Sock and 
Casper Ruud all in three straight sets. On the Round of 16 he beats the French Wildcard player Hugo Gaston in five sets.
Gaston plays 53 dropshots in the whole match and lost the match in the fifth 3-6. Thiem played his 5th Quarterfinal in Roland
Garros in a row now vs. his friend Diego Schwartzman but lost after a five-hour-battle with three tiebreaks in five sets (6-7,
7-5, 7-6, 6-7, 2-6)

Vienna Open

Thiem came as a defending champion to his home city Vienna. He won the opening round over Vitaliy Sachko followed by Cristian Garin both in straight sets. In the Quarter he was beaten by the later 2020 Vienna Open Champion Andrey Rublev in two sets. After the match he withdraws from the 2020 Rolex Paris Masters, because he had during the second during 
blister problems on his feet.

ATP finals

Thiem was drawn to a group with Nadal, Tsitsipas and Rublev. The first match Thiem won over the last year Champion Stefanos
Tsitsipas in three tight sets. In the second robin-round-match he beats Rafael Nadal in two tiebreakers. After that match
Thiem was qualified for the Semifinals as a group winner. He lost the final robin-round-match by Andrey Rublev in straight 
sets. In the Semifinals he met Novak Djokovic. He won the opening set 7-5 and had a match point in the second set, but lost the set in the tiebreak. In the final set he was 0-4 in the tiebreak down, but he comebacks and won the final tiebreaker 7-5
and reached his second Final at this event in a row. Thiem lost the final match of the season to Daniil Medvedev in three
sets, ending his season. The 2020 season was the best season of Dominic Thiem's career so far.

All matches
This table lists all the matches of Djokovic in 2020, including walkovers (W/O).

Singles matches

Doubles matches

Yearly records

Finals

Singles: 3 (1 title)

See also
 2020 ATP Tour
 2020 Novak Djokovic tennis season
 2020 Rafael Nadal tennis season

References

External links
  
 ATP tour profile

2020 tennis player seasons
2020 in Austrian tennis
2020 in Austrian sport